Ternopil Raion is a raion in Ternopil Oblast in western Ukraine. Its administrative center is Ternopil. It has a population of 

On 18 July 2020, as part of the administrative reform of Ukraine, the number of raions of Ternopil Oblast was reduced to three, and the area of Ternopil Raion was significantly expanded. Six abolished raions, Berezhany, Kozova, Pidhaitsi, Pidvolochysk, Terebovlia, and Zboriv Raions, a part of one more abolished raion, Zbarazh Raion, as well as Berezhany Municipality and the city of Ternopil, which was previously incorporated as a city of oblast significance and did not belong to the raion, were merged into Ternopil Raion. The January 2020 estimate of the raion population was

Subdivisions

Current
After the reform in July 2020, the raion consisted of 25 hromadas:
 Baikivtsi rural hromada with the administration in the selo of Baikivtsi, retained from Ternopil Raion;
 Bila rural hromada with the administration in the selo of Bila, retained from Ternopil Raion;
 Berezhany urban hromada with the administration in the city of Berezhany, transferred from Berezhany Raion and Berezhany Municipality;
 Ivanivka rural hromada with the administration in the selo of Ivanivka, transferred from Terebovlia Raion;
 Kozliv settlement hromada with the administration in the urban-type settlement of Kozliv, transferred from Kozova Raion;
 Kozova settlement hromada with the administration in the urban-type settlement of Kozova, transferred from Kozova Raion;
 Kupchyntsi rural hromada with the administration in the selo of Kupchyntsi, transferred from Kozova Raion;
 Mykulyntsi settlement hromada with the administration in the urban-type settlement of Mykulyntsi, transferred from Terebovlia Raion;
 Naraiv rural hromada with the administration in the selo of Naraiv, transferred from Berezhany Raion;
 Ozerna rural hromada with the administration in the selo of Ozerna, transferred from Zboriv Raion;
 Pidhaitsi urban hromada with the administration in the city of Pidhaitsi, transferred from Pidhaitsi Raion;
 Pidhorodne rural hromada with the administration in the selo of Pidhorodne, retained from Ternopil Raion;
 Pidvolochysk settlement hromada with the administration in the urban-type settlement of Pidvolochysk, transferred from Pidvolochysk Raion;
 Saranchuky rural hromada with the administration in the selo of Saranchuky, transferred from Berezhany Raion;
 Skalat urban hromada with the administration in the city of Skalat, transferred from Pidvolochysk Raion;
 Skoryky rural hromada with the administration in the selo of Skoryky, transferred from Pidvolochysk Raion;
 Terebovlia urban hromada with the administration in the city of Terebovlia, transferred from Terebovlia Raion;
 Ternopil urban hromada with the administration in the city of Ternopil, transferred from the city of Ternopil and Zboriv Raion;
 Velyka Berezovytsia settlement hromada with the administration in the urban-type settlement of Velyka Berezovytsia, retained from Ternopil Raion;
 Velyki Birky settlement hromada with the administration in the urban-type settlement of Velyki Birky, retained from Ternopil Raion;
 Velyki Hai rural hromada with the administration in the selo of Velyki Hai, retained from Ternopil Raion;
 Zaliztsi settlement hromada with the administration in the urban-type settlement of Zaliztsi, transferred from Zboriv Raion;
 Zbarazh urban hromada with the administration in the city of Zbarazh, transferred from Zbarazh Raion;
 Zboriv urban hromada with the administration in the city of Zboriv, transferred from Zboriv Raion;
 Zolotnyky rural hromada with the administration in the selo of Zolotnyky, transferred from Terebovlia Raion.

Before 2020

Before the 2020 reform, the raion consisted of six hromadas:
 Baikivtsi rural hromada with the administration in Baikivtsi;
 Bila rural hromada with the administration in Bila;
 Pidhorodne rural hromada with the administration in Pidhorodne;
 Velyka Berezovytsia settlement hromada with the administration in Velyka Berezovytsia;
 Velyki Birky settlement hromada with the administration in Velyki Birky;
 Velyki Hai rural hromada with the administration in Velyki Hai.

Settlements
Urban-type Settlement
Velyki Birky
Velyka Berezovytsia

Villages
 
Anhelivka
Baikivtsi
Bavoriv
Bila
Biloskirka
Butsniv
Cherneliv-Ruskyi
Chystyliv
Domamorych
Dovzhanka
Drahanivka
Dubivtsi
Dychkiv
Hai-Hrechynski
Hai-Shevchenkivski
Hrabovets
Ihrovytsya
Ivachiv Dolishnii
Ivachiv Horishnii
Khatky
Kostiantynivka
Kozivka
Kypyachka
Lozova
Luchka
Malyi Khodachkiv
Marianivka
Myroliubivka
Myshkovychi
Nastasiv
Ostriv
Petrykiv
Pidhorodne
Plotycha
Pochapyntsi
Proshova
Romanivka
Seredynky
Shliakhtyntsi
Skomorokhy
Smolianka
Smykivtsi
Soborne
Stehnykivtsi
Stupky
Teofilivka
Tovstoluh
Velyka Luka
Velyki Hai
Velykyi Hlybochok
Yosypivka
Zaboiky
Zastavye
Zastinka

See also
 Subdivisions of Ukraine

References

 
Raions of Ternopil Oblast
1966 establishments in Ukraine